The Zhuzi yulei (朱子語類 "A Collection of Conversations of Master Zhu") is a medieval Chinese text containing discussions between the eminent neo-Confucian scholar Zhu Xi and his disciples, in 140 chapters. Although the text was first arranged in 1270, the version of the text available is a 19th-century reprint of a 17th-century edition of the text.

The text is particularly significant in the study of the history of Chinese, as it is believed to record a type of Early Mandarin spoken during the Southern Song dynasty. An example of a grammatical phenomenon in the book is the use of 把 bǎ and 將 jiāng in a purposive construction with 來 lái or 去 qù, a construction particular to Middle Chinese and Early Mandarin.

把聖人之言來窮究。 (114.2756)
bǎ shèngrén zhī yán lái qióng jiū
take sage GEN word(s) come thorough(ly) study
"Take the words of the sage in order to study them thoroughly."

See also 

 Zhu Xi
 Anthology of the Patriarchal Hall
 Middle Chinese
 Early Mandarin

Bibliography 

 

Neo-Confucianism
Zhu Xi
13th-century Chinese books